Richwood Presbyterian Church, is the oldest Presbyterian Church in the Northern Kentucky tri county area and is located at 1070 Richwood Road, in Walton, Boone County, Kentucky. The Church was founded in 1834 by 13 members. The original 1844 church burned and the present church was built in 1870. The church was rebuilt by both black and white members. Church records include the baptism of Margaret Garner, who attempted to escape from slavery in 1856.

Richwood Presbyterian Church is a Kentucky Historic Landmark. Today this church is active, with a membership of about 60, and also is home to a private Montessori preschool. The Church is adjacent to a natural rock walled cemetery which is equally historic.

External links
Richwood Presbyterian Church
About the church

Churches in Boone County, Kentucky
Churches completed in 1870
19th-century Presbyterian church buildings in the United States
Religious organizations established in 1834
Presbyterian churches in Kentucky
Presbyterian organizations established in the 19th century
1834 establishments in Kentucky